Glen Seabrooke (born September 11, 1967) is a Canadian former professional ice hockey player who spent parts of three seasons in the National Hockey League (NHL) in the 1980s with the Philadelphia Flyers.

Playing career
As a youth, Seabrooke played in the 1980 Quebec International Pee-Wee Hockey Tournament with a minor ice hockey team from Peterborough, Ontario.

A center recognized for his abilities at both ends of the ice, Seabrooke was Philadelphia's first-round pick (21st overall) in the 1985 NHL Entry Draft. He made his NHL debut in 1986–87 at the age of only 19, scoring a goal and 5 points in 10 games. The following season, he was assigned to the Hershey Bears, Philadelphia's American Hockey League (AHL) affiliate, and notched 32 goals and 78 points in his first full professional season. He also played 6 more games for the Flyers, but was unable to crack a deep squad full-time.

Seabrooke found himself back in the AHL for the 1988–89 season. However, on February 22, 1989 he crashed into a goalpost and severely injured his shoulder. Reconstructive surgery that summer was unable to fix the problem, and Seabrooke's career was over at the age of only 21. He later sued team doctors for improperly rushing his rehab and causing permanent damage to his left arm, and in 1995 he was awarded a settlement of $5.5 million (US) in compensation.

He finished his NHL career with 1 goal and 7 points in just 19 games.

Career statistics

References

External links
 

1967 births
Living people
Canadian ice hockey centres
Hershey Bears players
Sportspeople from Peterborough, Ontario
National Hockey League first-round draft picks
Peterborough Petes (ice hockey) players
Philadelphia Flyers draft picks
Philadelphia Flyers players
Ice hockey people from Ontario